The chief of staff of the Air Force (acronym: CSAF, or AF/CC) is a statutory office held by a general in the United States Air Force, and as such is the principal military advisor to the secretary of the Air Force on matter pertaining to the Air Force; and is in a separate capacity, a member of the Joint Chiefs of Staff, and thereby a military adviser to the National Security Council, the secretary of defense, and the President. The chief of staff is typically the highest-ranking officer on active duty in the Air Force unless the chairman and/or the vice chairman of the Joint Chiefs of Staff are Air Force officers.

The chief of staff of the Air Force is an administrative position based in the Pentagon, and while the chief of staff does not have operational command authority over Air Force forces (that is within the purview of the combatant commanders who report to the secretary of defense), the chief of staff does exercise supervision of Air Force units and organizations as the designee of the secretary of the Air Force. 

The current chief of staff of the Air Force is General Charles Q. Brown Jr..

Responsibilities

Department of the Air Force
Under the authority, direction and control of the secretary of the Air Force, the chief of staff presides over the Air Staff, acts as the Secretary's executive agent in carrying out approved plans, and exercises supervision, consistent with authority assigned to the commanders of the Unified Combatant Commands, over organizations and members of the Air Force as determined by the Secretary. The chief of staff may also perform other duties as assigned by either the president, the secretary of defense or the secretary of the Air Force.

The vice chief of staff of the Air Force, also a four-star general, is the chief of staff's principal deputy.

Member of the Joint Chiefs of Staff
When performing his JCS duties the chief of staff is responsible directly to the secretary of defense. Like the other members of the Joint Chiefs of Staff, the chief of staff is an administrative position, with no operational command authority over the United States Air Force.

Appointment and rank

The chief of staff is nominated for appointment by the president, for a four-year term of office, and must be confirmed via majority vote by the Senate. Any Air Force officer with the rank of brigadier general and above may be appointed as chief of staff, but prospective nominees are typically laterally promoted from other four-star assignments. The chief can be reappointed to serve one additional term, but only during times of war or national emergency declared by Congress. To qualify for the position, the nominee must also have significant joint duty experience, and at least one full tour of duty in a joint duty assignment as a general officer unless the President waives this requirement. By statute, the chief of staff is appointed as a four-star general without vacating his permanent rank.

Special uniform cap
The chief of staff is also authorized to wear a special service cap with clouds and lightning bolts around the band of the hat. This cap is different from those worn by other general officers of the Air Force and it is for use by the Chief of Staff and Air Force officers serving as Chairman or Vice Chairman of the Joint Chiefs of Staff.

List of chiefs of staff of the Air Force
Prior to the creation of this position, General Henry H. Arnold was designated the first chief of the Army Air Forces and commanding general of the Army Air Forces during World War II. His successor, Carl A. Spaatz became the first chief of staff of the Air Force upon the establishment of the United States Air Force.

Three chiefs of staff would go on to serve as chairman of the Joint Chiefs of Staff, namely Nathan F. Twining, George S. Brown and David C. Jones.

Timeline

References

Notes

United States
 
US
United States Air Force appointments